Leon Hirsch Keyserling (January 11, 1908 – August 9, 1987) was an American economist and lawyer who served as chairman of the Council of Economic Advisers from 1950 to 1953. During his tenure, he advised President Harry S. Truman on the economic issues and helped draft major pieces of Fair Deal legislation.

Early life
Keyserling was born in 1908 in Charleston, South Carolina and grew up on Saint Helena Island. He earned an A.B. from Columbia University in 1928 and a law degree from Harvard Law School in 1931. He returned to Columbia as a graduate student in the Department of Economics from 1931 to 1933, where he also taught for a short time. While there, Keyserling studied under Rexford Tugwell, but never finished his dissertation.

Keyserling married Mary Dublin Keyserling, also an economist.

Government career
In 1933 Keyserling became an attorney for the newly constituted Agricultural Adjustment Administration, a New Deal agency that distributed subsidies to reduce crop area. From 1933 to 1946 he was a consultant economist to the Senate on a variety of social, economic, industrial, and financial issues, during which time he also served as a legislative assistant to Democratic New York Senator Robert F. Wagner (1933–37) and held several positions, including general counsel, in the US Housing Authority (later, the Federal Public Housing Authority in the National Housing Agency) (1937–46). It was during his time with Wagner that Keyserling was participating in drafting various New Deal initiatives, including the National Industrial Recovery Act, the Social Security Act, and the National Labor Relations Act.

In 1946 Keyserling became the Vice Chairman of the newly created Council of Economic Advisers. He became its Acting Chairman in 1949 and the Chairman in 1950. In 1952 Keyserling and his wife were attacked by Joseph McCarthy as part of the Second Red Scare as "belonging to Communist front groups." Keyserling left as Chairman in 1953.

During his time at the CEA, Keyserling strongly promoted the pursuit of sustained economic growth and full employment. He also introduced the reporting of the Gross National Product in real as well as nominal dollars

Later life
Following his time advising President Truman, Keyserling consulted with Congress on a variety of economic issues and also practiced law. In 1954 he founded the Conference on Economic Progress (CEP), serving as its president until 1987.  His wife had left the Department of Commerce in 1953 and joined him in consulting as well as the founding of the CEP, where she served as associate director from its inception to 1963.

In 1969 Keyserling served as president of the National Committee for Labor in Israel, a US organization that worked with the Israeli Histadrut.

He died on August 9, 1987, at Washington, D.C.'s George Washington University Hospital.

Writings
Based on Leon H. Keyserling Papers in the Harry S. Truman Presidential Library and Museum.

Redirecting Education (with Rexford Tugwell) (1934)
Toward Full Employment and Full Production (1954)
Consumption-Key to Full Prosperity (1957)
The Federal Budget and the General Welfare (1959)
The Peace by Investment Corporation (with Benjamin Javitts) (1962)
Taxes and the Public Interest (1963)
Progress or Poverty (1964)
The Move Toward Railroad Mergers (1965)
A Freedom Budget for All Americans (1966)
The Scarcity School of Economics (1973)
Liberal and Conservative National Economic Policies and Their Consequences, 1919-79 (1979)
The Current Significance of the New Deal (1984)

References

Further reading

External links
Leon Keyserling Papers at Georgetown University
Leon H. Keyserling Papers at the Truman Library

1908 births
1987 deaths
20th-century American economists
Columbia College (New York) alumni
Harvard Law School alumni
People from Saint Helena Island, South Carolina
Economists from South Carolina
Chairs of the United States Council of Economic Advisers